Zimbo may refer to:

Arts and entertainment
 TV Zimbo, a television network in Angola
 Zimbo (film), a 1958 Bollywood film
 Zimbo Trio, a Brazilian instrumental ensemble established in 1964 in São Paulo
 a character in the Aaahh!!! Real Monsters cartoon series
 "Zimbo", a song by Echo & the Bunnymen from the 1981 album Shine So Hard

Other uses
 Zimbo (Ruler of the Jagas), the predecessor of Mussasa in what is now Angola
 "Zimbo", a demonym for a person from Zimbabwe
 Zimbo, a term proposed by the philosopher Daniel Dennett, meaning a philosophical zombie which can interrogate and discuss its own internal states